The 1938 SANFL Grand Final was an Australian rules football competition.   beat  152 to 106.

References 

SANFL Grand Finals
SANFL Grand Final, 1938